Jisk'a Uma (Aymara jisk'a small, uma water, "little water", also spelled Jiskha Uma) is a mountain in the Bolivian Andes which reaches a height of approximately . It is located in the La Paz Department, Loayza Province, Luribay Municipality. Jisk'a Uma lies northwest of Nasa Q'ara and southeast of Ch'apini.

References 

Mountains of La Paz Department (Bolivia)